Bridge is a feature on Earth's Moon, a crater in the Hadley–Apennine region.

The name of the crater was formally adopted by the IAU in 1973.

Location 
Bridge crater is located within Hadley Rille, also known as the Hadley-Apennine region, and its ejecta indeed forms a bridge of sorts across the rille.  It lies at the base of Mons Hadley Delta and is approximately 4 km southwest of the Apollo 15 landing point.

Adjacent craters 
The larger St. George crater is to the southeast and the smaller Elbow crater is due east.

References

External links
 Apollo 15 Traverses, Lunar Photomap 41B4S4(25)

Impact craters on the Moon